Senator Iverson may refer to:

Alfred Iverson Sr. (1798–1873), U.S. Senator from Georgia
Stewart Iverson (born 1950), Iowa State Senate